Ratan Lal Joshi (1922-2006) was an Indian independence activist, journalist, writer . Born on 28 June 1922 at Churu, a desert city then in Bikaner State. Joshi was involved with the Indian freedom struggle from the age of 18 and suffered incarceration during the Quit India movement. Choosing journalism as a career, he joined Harijan weekly founded by Mahatma Gandhi and trained under the then chief editor, Kishorelal Bhai Mashrulawa. Later, he worked at several publishing houses and edited journals such as Bhai-Bahin, Samaj Sewak, Veer Bhoomi, Rajasthan, Rajasthan Samaj,  and Kul Lakshmi. Lal kile main, Krantikari Prer ne Ke Srot and Mrityunjayee are three books published by him.

After the Indian independence, Joshi was associated with several organizations. He was the founder president of Shaheed Smarak Eavam Swadhinata Sangram Shodh Sansthan, a Jaipur-based organization, Secretary of the All-India Freedom Fighters' Organisation and a member of the presidium of the Rajasthan Freedom Fighters’ Organisation. During early 1970s he was a close advisor of Indira Gandhi.
. He died on 19 September 2006, at Mumbai, at the age of 84.

See also 
 Navajivan Trust

References 

Recipients of the Padma Bhushan in literature & education
1922 births
2006 deaths
Indian independence activists from Rajasthan
Indian male journalists
Journalists from Rajasthan
Indian National Congress politicians
People from Churu district
20th-century Indian journalists